Kashaya has several meanings, see:

 Kāṣāya, the traditional monastic robes of Buddhist monks and nuns.
 Kashaya language, a distinct Pomo language on the Sonoma County Coastline, California
 The subgroup of Pomo people who spoke this language
 Kashia Band of Pomo Indians of the Stewarts Point Rancheria
 Kashaya (Jainism), a word and concept in Jainism that roughly translates to "passion"